Mah is the moon figure of Zoroastrianism. 

Mah also may refer to:
 An alternative spelling of Ma (surname)
 mAh, milli ampere hour, a unit of electric charge
 Ljubljana Marsh, occasionally named Mah, also meaning 'moss' in Slovene
Mah. mahallesi, district
Languages:
 Mah, also known as Mann language of West Africa
 mah, code for Marshallese language of the central Pacific
People:

 Jeannie Mah (born 1952), Canadian ceramic artist
 Theresa Mah, American politician

See also 
 MAH (disambiguation)